Herbie Hide (born Herbert Okechukwu Maduagwu; 27 August 1971) is a British former professional boxer who competed from 1989 to 2010. He held the WBO heavyweight title twice between 1994 and 1999, as well as the British heavyweight title in 1993. Hide was known for his formidable punching power and killer instinct in the ring.

Early life
Hide was born in Amauzari, Nigeria, and moved to England as a youngster, basing himself near Norwich in Norfolk.  He was educated at Glebe House School and Cawston College.

Amateur career
Hide had a brief amateur career of 10 fights, which he finished with a record of 8 wins (7 KOs), 2 losses.

Highlights
 1989 ABA Championships, heavyweight:
1/8: Defeated M. Brown on points
1/4: Defeated N. Smith RSC 1
1/2: Defeated Denzill Browne RSC 3
Finals: Lost to Henry Akinwande on points

Professional career
Herbie Hide has fought for most of his professional boxing career as a heavyweight ; but later in his career, decided to go down to the lighter cruiserweight division .  He was known as The Dancing Destroyer, and had a successful career, rising to domestic success at a very young age for a heavyweight.  Hide has twice won the lesser regarded World Boxing Organization (WBO) heavyweight title.

Hide's professional career began in 1989 with a second round win, and he racked up a total of 25 successive wins, all but one inside the distance.  His level of opposition was respectable, and included fighters such as Jeff Lampkin and James Pritchard.

At 25 wins to 0 losses (24 from knockout (KO)), Hide challenged Michael Bentt for the WBO heavyweight title in March 1994 at Millwall Football Stadium, Millwall, London.  The inexperienced Bentt had previously won the title by knocking out the heavily favoured Tommy Morrison in one round.  The Hide vs Bentt fight made headlines after the two boxers scuffled and threw punches at a pre-fight meeting; whilst in the bout itself, Hide out-boxed and knocked out Bentt in 7 rounds.  Bentt was subsequently hospitalised, and never fought again.

A year later, Hide defended his WBO heavyweight title against former undisputed champion Riddick Bowe.  Hide used his speed to out-box Bowe early on, and managed to hurt Bowe several times during the contest.  However Bowe's size and class eventually told, and Hide was floored six times during the bout.  Hide impressed with his courage, repeatedly picking himself off the canvas, before he was knocked out in the sixth round.

After his loss to Bowe, Hide fought twice in 1996, winning both by knockout (KO) against Michael Murray and Frankie Swindell, before earning another shot at the now-vacant WBO title in June 1997 against 38-year-old one-time International Boxing Federation (IBF) title holder Tony Tucker, despite Tucker losing three of his previous five fights.  Hide knocked out the overweight Tucker in two rounds.  Hide defended his WBO title twice in 1998; with quick stoppages of late replacement cruiserweight clubfighter Damon Reed, and in September 1998 against German Willi Fischer.

In June 1999, Hide faced the 6 ft 8in Ukrainian Vitali Klitschko at the London Arena, only the second world ranked fighter he had actually faced after Riddick Bowe.  Hide, favoured to win at the time, was knocked out in two rounds.

Hide never featured as a main contender at heavyweight again, his only mildly notable wins coming against Joseph Chingangu (who also knocked Hide out in one of Hide's many comebacks), and Alexander Vasiliev.

In 2006, Hide moved down in weight  to a more natural division at cruiserweight.  Since then, he has won fourteen successive fights, most of which took place in Germany.  Hide defeated Mikhail Nasyrov in December 2007 to win the World Boxing Council (WBC) International cruiserweight title.

In November 2008, when Johnathon Banks dropped out of a WBO cruiserweight title clash at London's ExCel Arena with just four days notice, Hide was announced as a potential opponent for former champion Enzo Maccarinelli, for the vacant title.  This was despite Hide having fought just two weeks earlier, a victory against Lukasz Rusiewicz.  Hide then fought in the Cruiserweight Prizefighter tournament.  In the tournament, he defeated Welshman Wayne Brooks by unanimous decision, but was badly cut on the right eye in the process.  He pulled out of the tournament to avoid losing his high WBC ranking due to the cut.

Personal life
In December 2003, Hide was 'attacked by a group of men' in a Norwich night club. This resulted in his subsequent arrest and conviction for 'possession of an offensive weapon, a 10-inch kitchen knife', for which he was fined £750.

In September 2008, Hide was warned by Norwich Magistrates that he faced 75 days in jail if £3,767 of outstanding motoring fines were not paid by 30 November 2008.  During a television interview in July 2008, Hide claimed that promoter Frank Warren "had dishonestly and corruptly bribed Johnny Nelson to retire and give up his WBO cruiserweight title".  When Warren sued for libel, Hide failed to respond and a default judgment of £35,000 was entered against him.

Hide appeared at Norwich Crown Court, charged with rape, but was found not guilty on 20 July 2011 after 'the prosecution offered no evidence'.

On 18 March 2012, a man in his 20s was fatally stabbed at Hide's home in Bawburgh.  A suspect was arrested for murder in connection with the incident.  Police said they believed Hide was not home at the time of the killing.

On 29 November 2013, Hide was sentenced to 22 months in prison for conspiracy to supply cocaine.  He was targeted by the so-called 'fake sheikh' also known as Mazher Mahmood, an undercover News of the World reporter. After an initial refusal, Hide relented, and agreed to contact a drug dealer of his acquaintance to procure the drug.  When he delivered the drug to the undercover reporter he was arrested and charged.

Professional boxing record

References

Further reading

External links

1971 births
Living people
People from Owerri
English male boxers
Black British sportsmen
Heavyweight boxers
Cruiserweight boxers
World heavyweight boxing champions
World Boxing Organization champions
Prizefighter contestants
People educated at Cawston College
People educated at Glebe House School
Nigerian emigrants to the United Kingdom
English people convicted of drug offences
Igbo sportspeople
Sportspeople from Norwich
Nigerian male boxers
People from South Norfolk (district)
Sportspeople convicted of crimes
People acquitted of rape
Sportspeople from Imo State